Aleochara lustrica is a species of rove beetle in the family Staphylinidae. It is found in Central America and North America.

References

Further reading

 
 

Aleocharinae
Articles created by Qbugbot
Beetles described in 1834
Beetles of Central America
Beetles of North America